Kurt Bittel (born 5 July 1907 in Heidenheim an der Brenz, died 30 January 1991 in Heidenheim an der Brenz) was a German prehistorian. As president of the German Archaeological Institute (Deutschen Archäologischen Instituts - DAI) and excavator of the Hittite city of Hattusha in Turkey, as well as an expert on the Celts in Central Europe, he acquired great merit.

Decorations and awards
State awards
 Great Cross of Merit of the Federal Republic of Germany (1955)
 Pour le Mérite for Sciences and Arts (Member, 1967; Chancellor of the Order 1971–1979; 3rd Vice-Chancellor from 1979 to 1980; 2nd Vice-Chancellor 1980–1984)
 Austrian Decoration for Science and Art (1978)
 Order of Merit of Baden-Württemberg (1982)
 Grand Cross of Merit with Star and Sash of Merit of the Federal Republic of Germany (1984)

Memberships
 Honorary member of the İstanbul Enstitüsü (1955), Turkish Historical Society (Türk Tarih Kurumu; Ankara, 1959), Royal Irish Academy (Dublin, 1965), Société de Yougoslavie Archéologique (Arheološko Društvo Jugoslavije, Belgrade, 1966), German-Turkish Association (Bonn, 1970), Society for Pre- and Early History in Württemberg and Hohenzollern (Gesellschaft für Archäologie in Württemberg und Hohenzollern) (1977), Honorary Member of the German Archaeological Institute (1982)
 Honorary Corresponding Member of The Prehistoric Society (Oxford, 1956)
 Honorary Fellow of the Society of Antiquaries of London (1965)
 Foreign Honorary Member of the Archaeological Institute of America (New York, 1967), American Academy of Arts and Sciences (Boston, Massachusetts, 1980), and the American Philosophical Society (Philadelphia, Pennsylvania, 1984).

Other
 Honorary Citizen of the city of Heidenheim (1967)
 Honorary doctorates from the University of Istanbul (1969), Anadolu University (Anadolu Üniversitesi) (Eskişehir, Turkey; 1990)

References

1907 births
1991 deaths
People from Heidenheim
Recipients of the Pour le Mérite (civil class)
Recipients of the Austrian Decoration for Science and Art
Recipients of the Order of Merit of Baden-Württemberg
Grand Crosses with Star and Sash of the Order of Merit of the Federal Republic of Germany
Members of the Royal Irish Academy
Fellows of the Society of Antiquaries of London
Fellows of the American Academy of Arts and Sciences
German male non-fiction writers
Corresponding Fellows of the British Academy
Travelers in Asia Minor

Members of the American Philosophical Society